The 2016–17 South Dakota State Jackrabbits women's basketball represent South Dakota State University in the 2016–17 NCAA Division I women's basketball season. The Jackrabbits, led by seventeenth year head coach Aaron Johnston. The Jackrabbits compete in the Summit League. They play home games in Frost Arena, in Brookings, South Dakota.

Roster

Schedule

|-
!colspan=9 style="background:#003896; color:#F7D417;"| Exhibition

|-
!colspan=9 style="background:#003896; color:#F7D417;"| Non-conference regular season

|-
!colspan=9 style="background:#003896; color:#F7D417;"| The Summit League regular season

|-
!colspan=9 style="background:#003896; color:#F7D417;"| The Summit League Women's Tournament

|-
!colspan=9 style="background:#003896; color:#F7D417;"| WNIT

See also
2016–17 South Dakota State Jackrabbits men's basketball team

References

South Dakota State Jackrabbits women's basketball seasons
South Dakota State
2017 Women's National Invitation Tournament participants
Jack
Jack